Peter & the Wolf/Carnival of the Animals – Part II is a studio album by American parody singer-songwriter and musician "Weird Al" Yankovic and composer and keyboardist Wendy Carlos, released in October 1988 on CBS Records. It features a comical adaptation of the orchestral works Peter and the Wolf by Sergei Prokofiev and The Carnival of the Animals by Camille Saint-Saëns.

Accolades
The album was nominated for the Grammy Award for Best Album for Children at the 31st ceremony.

Background
Wendy Carlos was invited by CBS Records to work on the project with Yankovic. She later recounted that "the project was a chance for some musical fun and tomfoolery, working with a bright, witty collaborator, before getting back to more adventurous tuning and timbre projects." Carlos wrote new music for both stories.

Tracks
"Peter and the Wolf" track reprises the original story, with some humorous changes. The animals are named: Billy the Bird, Bruce the Duck, Louie the Cat, and Seymour the Wolf. There is also a new minor character named Bob the Janitor, represented musically by Yankovic's signature instrument, the accordion. After a long conflict between Peter and the wolf, Peter catches the wolf with dental floss. The moral of the story is "Oral hygiene is very important, make sure you see your dentist at least twice a year".

"The Carnival of the Animals – Part Two" is a parody of The Carnival of the Animals by Camille Saint-Saëns. Carlos wrote new music for both stories. The introduction explains: "Camille, in his research, was slightly behind, and I guess that some critters just plain slipped his mind, so to fill in this void in the Animal Kingdom, I'll read some new verses. I'm not gonna sing 'em."

Release
On the LP and cassette releases, each side is one continuous track; the CD separates the parts of side 2. As of 2022, the CD, LP, and cassette releases of Peter and the Wolf are all out of print and have become collector's items, all of which going for very high prices on both Amazon and eBay.

Track listing

LP/Cassette

CD

References

1988 albums
Albums produced by Wendy Carlos
CBS Records albums
Classical albums by American artists
Concept albums
"Weird Al" Yankovic albums
Wendy Carlos albums
Peter and the Wolf